Hans "Hennes" Stubb (8 October 1906 – 19 March 1973) was a German footballer.

Club career 
He played in defense for Eintracht Frankfurt from 1928 to 1944.

International career 
He also played 10 times for Germany, scoring one goal. Stubb shot his only international against Hungary on a wet pitch from 60 metres.

Trivia 
Hans Stubb is listed as an honoured captain at Eintracht Frankfurt.

Honours 

 German championship : 
 Runners-up: 1932
 Southern German championship:
 Champions: 1930, 1932
 Runners-up: 1930–31
 Gauliga Südwest/Mainhessen
 Champions: 1938
 Runners-up: 1936–37
 Bezirksliga Main-Hessen:
 Winners: 1927–28, 1928–29, 1929–30, 1930–31, 1931–32
 Runners-up: 1932–33

References

External links 
 
 
 
 Hans Stubb at eintracht-archiv.de

1906 births
1973 deaths
German footballers
Germany international footballers
Eintracht Frankfurt players
Association football midfielders